Scott Hileman is a retired American soccer goalkeeper who played professionally in the Continental Indoor Soccer League and the National Professional Soccer League.  He played two games for the United States national futsal team at the 2004 FIFA Futsal World Championship.

Youth 
Hileman graduated from Marcos De Niza High School.  In 1990, Hileman was goalkeeper for Marcos as it tied Brophy Prep in the Arizona Class 5-A state championship.  The game is considered one of the greatest in Arizona secondary history, featuring six future professionals and one future national team member.  Hileman attended the University of Portland where he is second behind Kasey Keller on the school’s goalkeeper records.  He graduated with a bachelor's degree in biology.

Professional 
In 1995, Hileman turned professional with the Arizona Sandsharks in the Continental Indoor Soccer League.  In 1996, he moved outdoors with the Sacramento Scorpions of the 1996 USISL Select League.  In the fall of 1996, Hileman signed with the Edmonton Driller of the National Professional Soccer League.  In June 1997, Hileman returned to the Sandsharks for the summer.  In September 1998, the Drillers sent Hileman to the expansion Florida Thundercats in exchange for cash.  On March 4, 1999, the Thundercats sold Hileman’s contract to the Baltimore Blast.  Hileman played for the Blast until 2004.  In 2000, he was Second Team All League.  In 2003 and 2004, he won the Major Indoor Soccer League championship with the Blast.  From 2007 to 2008, he played for Kickers Scotland Yard in the Suncoast Soccer League.

Futsal 
Hileman played for the United States national futsal team.  He played two games for the team at the 2004 FIFA Futsal World Championship.

References 

Living people
1972 births
Futsal goalkeepers
Soccer players from Phoenix, Arizona
American soccer players
American men's futsal players
Arizona Sandsharks players
Baltimore Blast (NPSL) players
Baltimore Blast (2001–2008 MISL) players
Continental Indoor Soccer League players
Edmonton Drillers (1996–2000) players
Florida ThunderCats players
Major Indoor Soccer League (2001–2008) players
National Professional Soccer League (1984–2001) players
Portland Pilots men's soccer players
Sacramento Scorpions players
USISL Select League players
Association football goalkeepers